Patricio Andrés Lira Navarrete (born in Temuco, Chile) is a Chilean football manager and former football midfielder.

Club career
Patricio Lira began his playing career with Deportes Temuco, having also played for Cobresal and Ñublense. He joined Unión Temuco in 2010.

Managerial career
In 2012, he began his managerial career as the assistant coach of Carlos Girardengo in Deportes Temuco. In 2019, he took the charge as the head coach of Deportes Temuco after Hugo Vilches was released. In 2022, he became the manager of Fernández Vial.

References

External links

Patricio Lira at playmakerstats.com (English version of ceroacero.es)

1979 births
Living people
People from Temuco
Chilean footballers
Chilean Primera División players
Primera B de Chile players
Deportes Temuco footballers
Cobresal footballers
Ñublense footballers
C.D. Antofagasta footballers
Unión Temuco footballers
Chilean football managers
Primera B de Chile managers
Deportes Temuco managers
Arturo Fernández Vial managers
Association football midfielders